FabricLive.25 is a DJ mix compilation album by High Contrast, as part of the FabricLive Mix Series.

Track listing 
  Adam F - 8Ball - Breakbeat Kaos
  London Elektricity - Power Ballad - Hospital Records
  DJ Marky, Bungle & DJ Roots - Restart - Innerground Records
  Logistics - Life Rhythm - Hospital Records
  Cyantific Vs Logistics - Flashback - Hospital Records
  Funky Technicians - Desperate Housewives - Advanced Recordings
  Martyn - Nxt 2 u - Play:musik
  Cyantific - Ghetto Blaster - Hospital Records
  Jenna G - Woe - Bingo Beats
  Matrix Vs Futurebound - Strength 2 Strength - Metro Recordings/Viper Recordings
  Artificial Intelligence - The Big Picture - Widescreen Recordings
  Craggz And Parallel Forces - Love Insane - Valve Recordings
  Danny Byrd - Soul Function - Hospital Records
  Blame - Solar Burn - Charge Recordings
  Logistics - Summer Sun - Hospital Records
  Chris S.U. & SKC - What's Happening? - Hospital Records
  State Of Mind - Real McCoy - CIA Records
  Nero - Bitch I'm Gone - Formation Records
  Total Science - Going In Circles (A.I. Remix) - CIA Records
  Klute - Hell Hath No Fury - Commercial Suicide
  Sparfunk & Joe Solo - Rapture - Ram Records
  High Contrast - Days Go By - The Contrast

External links 
Fabric: FabricLive.25

High Contrast albums
Live
2005 compilation albums